Maelor was a rural district in the administrative county of Flintshire, Wales,  from 1894 to 1974. The area approximated to the hundred of Maelor or English Maelor, and was notable for forming a detached part of the county, surrounded by Cheshire, Denbighshire and Shropshire. The administrative centre was located at Overton.

The district was formed as Overton Rural District by the Local Government Act 1894 from the Flintshire parishes of Ellesmere, Whitchurch and Wrexham Rural Sanitary Districts. It was renamed as Maelor Rural District in 1953. It consisted of eleven civil parishes:
Bangor on Dee
Bettisfield
Bronington
Halghton
Hanmer
Iscoyd
Overton
Penley
Tybroughton
Willington
Worthenbury

The district was abolished in 1974 by the Local Government Act 1972, when it was merged into Wrexham Maelor, one of six districts of the new County of Clwyd.

External links

Rural districts of Wales
History of Flintshire
History of Wrexham County Borough